Crenicara punctulatum, the checkerboard cichlid, is a species of cichlid fish native to creeks and rivers in the Amazon and Essequibo basins in South America.

References 

 Kullander, S.O., 1986. Cichlid fishes of the Amazon River drainage of Peru. Department of Vertebrate Zoology, Research Division, Swedish Museum of Natural History, Stockholm, Sweden,

External links 
 Crenicara punctulatum at fishbase

Geophagini
Cichlid fish of South America
Fish described in 1863
Taxa named by Albert Günther